Maya Esparza was the District 7 Councilmember on the San Jose City Council.

References

Hispanic and Latino American city council members
Hispanic and Latino American women in politics
San Jose City Council members
Living people
Year of birth missing (living people)
Women city councillors in California
21st-century American politicians
21st-century American women politicians